World Championship Poker is a series of poker video games first developed by Coresoft and released in 2005 by Crave Entertainment. The series capitalizes on the recent popularity of poker due to the successful World Series of Poker.

The first title of the series, World Championship Poker received generally favorable reviews when it was released. GameSpot criticized the title for its lack of refinement but acknowledged its multiplayer appeal. The GameCube version was cancelled.

In North America, the standard edition of the game carries an Everyone rating from the ESRB, but the special edition which includes the bonus Howard Lederer Tells All DVD carries a Mature rating.

World Championship Poker 2: Featuring Howard Lederer
The sequel was released a year later and improved upon some of the criticism found in the previous version. GameSpot's review complimented the computer AI and the use of online across all platforms.

World Championship Poker: Featuring Howard Lederer "All In"
The third game in the series was first released nine months later for the PlayStation 2, PlayStation Portable, and Xbox 360. Reviews for the game were mediocre, receiving an overall score that was lower than its predecessors. GameSpot criticized it for not introducing newer elements as had been done with competing franchises. A version for the Wii was then released in 2007, being developed by Point of View. It is known that the title will allow players to utilize the motion-sensing functionality of the Wii Remote to play the game.

World Championship Cards
A fourth game was made that was devoid of Poker. It was made with the same engine as the last World Championship Poker title, but with a lot of the newer features removed for this title. It was released for the PS2 and PSP.

See also
World Series of Poker: Tournament of Champions

References

External links
Publisher's site

505 Games games
2005 video games
Cancelled GameCube games
PlayStation 2 games
PlayStation Network games
Game Boy Advance games
Windows games
Xbox games
Nintendo DS games
Poker video games
Video games developed in the United States